Legally Blonde is a 2001 comedy novel by American author Amanda Brown, with a copyright credit also going to Brigid (Bridget) Kerrigan.

The novel was the basis of the 2001 film Legally Blonde which starred Reese Witherspoon and its 2003 sequel Legally Blonde 2: Red, White & Blonde, as well as the 2007 musical Legally Blonde and the 2009 direct-to-video film Legally Blondes.

The novel was based on Brown's experiences while enrolled in Stanford Law School.

Legally Blonde is also the basis of a series of young adult fiction novels featuring the character of Elle Woods written by Natalie Standiford.

Plot
Elle Woods, a blonde University of Southern California sorority president and homecoming queen, is deeply in love with her college sweetheart, Warner Huntington III. When Warner enrolls in Stanford Law School and aims to find a girl more serious than Elle to be his bride, Elle schemes a plan to follow him there to win him back.

References

2001 American novels
2001 debut novels
American comedy novels
American novels adapted into films
Blond hair
Campus novels
Novels set in California
Legally Blonde (franchise)